Johnny Dynamite is a comic book private detective character created by writer Ken Fitch and artist Pete Morisi. Johnny Dynamite appeared in 1953's Dynamite #3-9 published by Comic Media and in Johnny Dynamite #10-12 published by Charlton Comics. He also appeared in Charlton's Foreign Intrigues #13-15.

Max Allan Collins acquired the character from Charlton in 1987 and reprinted stories in Ms. Tree. Max Collins (writer) and Terry Beatty (artist) created a four-issue limited series with the name Johnny Dynamite published by Dark Horse Comics in 1994.

References

External links
 Johnny Dynamite at ThrillingDetective.com

Dark Horse Comics limited series